Isabella is the surname of:

 Andy Isabella (born 1996), American football player
 Fred Isabella (1917–2007), American dentist and politician
 Kira Isabella (born 1993), Canadian country music singer-songwriter
 Tony Isabella (born 1951), American comic book writer, editor, artist and critic